Fears Nachawati is an American plaintiffs' law firm headquartered in Dallas. The law firm was founded in 2006 by Bryan Fears and Majed Nachawati.

Fears Nachawati recruited and represented plaintiffs in multidistrict litigation regarding claims that the heart burn drug ranitidine causes cancer. The firm has paid for television advertisements seeking clients to pursue child abuse lawsuits against the Catholic Church.

References

External links
 

Privately held companies of the United States
Law firms based in Dallas
Law firms established in 2006